The Irish College of General Practitioners or ICGP is the recognised national professional body for general practice training in Ireland.  Founded in 1984, it represents over 2,500 general practitioners in Ireland and around the world.

Purpose
The ICGP's activities include:
 Teaching, training and education at undergraduate and postgraduate levels.
 Accreditation of the fourteen specialist training programmes in general practice.
 Conducting examinations for Membership of the Irish College of General Practitioners (MICGP).
 Promotion of continuing education, professional development and research.
 Practice management support through training, advice and consultancy.
 Promotion of general practitioner health.
 Public relations and interaction with the media on behalf of the profession.
 Give informed advice to its members and to the government.

Structure
The College is composed of a council, a board, and 37 regional faculties.

Council
The Council is the decision-making body of the ICGP.  Each faculty has at least one representative on the Council, with other places filled by election, co-option and ex officio appointment.

Board
The Board directs and integrates the work of the College's committees.  The Board consists of the officers of the College and the chairpersons of standing committees.

Faculties
The College has co-ordinates a network of 37 regional faculties. Each faculty is formally structured with its own bylaws, subject to approval by the Council.

Members
There are over 2,500 members and associates of the ICGP comprising over 85% of practicing GPs in the Republic of Ireland.  The College also has international members in Northern Ireland, the United Kingdom, Canada, Australia, New Zealand, and beyond.

Notable members
 Tony Holohan - Chief Medical Officer for Ireland

References

External links
 ICGP Website

1984 establishments in Ireland
Medical education in the Republic of Ireland
Organizations established in 1984
General practice organizations
Medical and health organisations based in the Republic of Ireland